Below are listed all participating squads of the 2010 FIVB Women's Volleyball World Championship, held in several cities in Japan from 29 October to 14 November 2010.

Squads
 This player is in main roster

Pool A

Coach: Mouloud Ikhedji

Coach: Braulio Godínez

Coach: Masayoshi Manabe

Coach:  Cheol Yong Kim

Coach: Jerzy Matlak

Coach: Zoran Terzić

Pool B

Coach: José Roberto Guimarães

Coach: Jirí Šiller

Coach: Massimo Barbolini

Coach:  Hidehiro Irisawa

Coach: Avital Selinger

Coach:  Carlos Cardona

Pool C

Coach: Miroslav Aksentijević

Coach: Juan Gala

Coach:  Giovanni Guidetti

Coach: Nelli Chsherbakova

Coach: Kiattipong Radchatagriengkai

Coach:  Hugh McCutcheon

Pool D





Coach:  Marcos Kwiek

Coach: Vladimir Kuzyutkin



Coach: Mehmet Nuri Bedestenlioğlu

References
FIVB Site

FIVB Volleyball Women's World Championship squads
2010 FIVB Volleyball Women's World Championship